Sagrada Família is a metro station in Barcelona Metro network. It is named after the famous, and adjacent, Basílica i Temple Expiatori de la Sagrada Família, a church first designed by architect Antoni Gaudí and still under construction. It is served by TMB-operated Barcelona Metro lines L2 and L5.

The station takes the form of two separate sections linked by a corridor within the paid area of the station complex. Both sections also have their own street entrances:

 The L2 section is located under Marina street, between Mallorca and Provença streets and has two accesses, one at each side of the station. The upper level has two halls. The trains run on the lower level that has two platforms, one bigger than the other one.
 The L5 section is located under Provença street, between Sardenya and Marina streets. The upper level has two halls and is equipped with a TMB Information Center and commercial areas. The trains run on the lower level.

The L5 section of the station was the first to open, with the opening, in 1970, of the line between Diagonal and Sagrera. The L2 section followed in 1995, with the opening of the line between Sant Antoni and this station.

Gallery

External links

Information about L2 metro station at TMB
Information about L5 metro station at TMB
Transports Metropolitans de Barcelona
Information about L2 metro station at Trenscat.com
Information about L5 metro station at Trenscat.com

Transport in Eixample
Railway stations in Spain opened in 1970
Barcelona Metro line 2 stations
Barcelona Metro line 5 stations